Karlshamn Municipality (Karlshamns kommun) is a municipality in Blekinge County in South Sweden in southern Sweden. It borders to Olofström Municipality, Sölvesborg Municipality, Ronneby Municipality and Tingsryd Municipality. The city of Karlshamn is the seat of the municipality.

Administrative territory
1863 at the time of first municipal legislation in Sweden, the area was divided into the City of Karlshamn and five rural municipalities. 1881 a further subdivision was made by Asarum into Ringamåla. The administrative reform in 1952 reduced the number of municipalities surrounding the town to Hällaryd (Hällaryds plus Åryds municipalities), Asarum (reunition of Asarum and Ringamåla), Mörrum (municipalities Elleholm plus Mörrum). In 1/1 1967 the town of Karlshamn was united with Asarum, Hällaryd och Mörrum to form the present municipality when all local government units in Sweden became municipalities of unitary type..

Localities 
There are 6 urban areas (also called a Tätort or locality) in Karlshamn Municipality.

In the table the localities are listed according to the size of the population as of December 31, 2010. The municipal seat is in bold characters.

Totally, 31.000 people live in Karlshamn which makes it the second largest municipality in Blekinge County.

Government and politics 
Distribution of the 51 seats in the municipal assembly (kommunfullmäktige] after the 2010 election:

Social Democratic Party   20
Moderate Party   11
Green Party   5
Sweden Democrats   5
Centre Party   3
Liberal People's Party   3
Left Party   2
Christian Democrats   1
Communist Party   1

Results of the 2010 Swedish general election in Karlshamn:

Social Democratic Party   37.3%
Moderate Party   26.3%
Sweden Democrats   9.4%
Green Party   6.3%
Left Party   6.1%
Liberal People's Party   5.3%
Centre Party   5.0%
Christian Democrats   3.5%

Economy 
The municipal tax is deducted as a percentage of individual citizens income. It is 21.89% 2009. The average personal income in the municipality was 158594 SEK year 2009. This is 96% of the national average (SCB). The council also derives income from the municipal harbour, the energy services etc.

Parishes 
Parishes ordered by city and hundreds:

Karlshamn
Karlshamn Parish
Bräkne Hundred
Asarum Parish
Hällaryd Parish
Mörrum Parish
Ringamåla Parish
Åryd Parish
Lister Hundred
Elleholm Parish
Mörrum Parish

References 

Statistics Sweden

External links 

Karlshamn Municipality - Official site
Coat of arms

 
Municipalities of Blekinge County